Callidula hypoleuca is a moth of the  family Callidulidae. It is found on the Bismarck Archipelago of Papua New Guinea.

References

Callidulidae
Lepidoptera of Papua New Guinea
Moths described in 1887